The Han River (lit. "dry creek") is a river located in Taichung, Taiwan. The river flows southwards from Gonglaoping in Fengyuan District until it joins the Dali River near Provincial Highway 74 in Dali District. 

Even though the river is wide, it's relatively low discharge means that the river runs dry for most of the year, hence the name. A bike path known as the "Han River Bike Trail" (旱溪自行車道) runs alongside the river between Fengyuan and Dali.

References 

Rivers of Taiwan
Landforms of Taichung